Santopadre is a small town and comune in the province of Frosinone, Lazio region of Italy.

It served by its station on the Avezzano-Roccasecca railroad.

References

Cities and towns in Lazio